Martin Lake is a lake in Martin County, in the U.S. state of Minnesota.

Martin Lake was named for early settler Henry Martin, as was Martin County.

See also
List of lakes in Minnesota

References

Lakes of Minnesota
Lakes of Martin County, Minnesota